Zacapoaxtla Municipality is a municipality in Puebla in south-eastern Mexico.

Zacapoaxtla Municipality is located in the mountains northeast of Puebla, between geographical coordinates 19° 44' 18 and 19° 59' 18 N latitude and 97° 31' 42 and 97° 37' 54 W longitude. 

Zacapoaxtla is bounded 
 on the east by Tlatlauquitepec Municipality and Zaragoza Municipality, 
 on the north by Cuetzalan del Progreso Municipality, 
 on the northwest by Nauzontla Municipality,
 on the west by Xochiapulco Municipality, and 
 on the south by Zautla Municipality.
It has an area of 188.8 km², that makes it the 66th largest with respect to the other municipalities of the state of Puebla.

References

Municipalities of Puebla